Alpha-(1,3)-fucosyltransferase is an enzyme that in humans is encoded by the FUT5 gene.

References

Further reading